Gilva was a Roman–Berber city in the province of Mauretania Caesariensis. It flourished during the Roman and Vandal empires. It was located to the south of Hippo Regius in present-day Algeria. The town existed from around 300 to 640AD.

Gilva is known through the writing of Augustine, over a dispute over an appointment of a bishop to the bishopric seat who was unwanted by the parishioners.

The town was a colonia and one of 170 bishoprics in Roman North Africa. In 422, there was a local Church synod.

Roman rule in the city ended in the 7th century with the spread of Islam.

See also
Catholic Church in Algeria

References

Archaeological sites in Algeria
Roman towns and cities in Algeria
Catholic titular sees in Africa
Ancient Berber cities